Sattari (Sot'tori, pronounced) is a sub-district of North Goa district in the state of Goa, India. The headquarters of Sattari taluka is Valpoi (वाळपई) municipal council. It lies in the north-eastern region of Goa where it is known for its greenery and dense forest. Part of the Western Ghats forms the eastern part of the Sattari taluka. The Mandovi River (popularly known as Mhadei in Sattari taluka) is considered to be the lifeline of Sattari. It has a geographical area of 490 km2; the Mhadei Wildlife Sanctuary covers 208 km2 of this area.

Rural Goa
Sattari is part of interior rural Goa. Some of the recent news that emerged from there includes cyclonic winds hitting part of the region in mid-October 2018, farmers protesting land ownership issues, protests over electricity issues and potholes in the roads, among others.

Seventy villages
Sattari is believed to comprise 70 villages, as suggested by its name, which is believed to be a derivative from the Konkani word 'seventy'. Among these are:
 Brahmacarmali, which is directly related to Karmali or Carambolim, connected with the migration of the deity of Lord Brahma and the only home in Goa of a Brahmadeva temple in Goa. (Brahma temples are considered rare.
 Dhave/धावे is a village which was connected by the first Kadamba state-run bus service to Panjim, GDX-001, when it was started in 1980. 
 Hedoda/Nadoda. Like some other twin villages in Sattari, this too is a set of twin villages.
 Ambede/Bhombede. This is second pair of twin villages. Ambede is a village of veteran litterateur, researcher and scholar Pandit MahadevShastri Joshi who wrote an entire Indian cultural encyclopaedia on his own. He is known to have lost a huge amount of his written literature in Panshet dam tragedy in Pune in the 1960s.
  Thane is a village which claims the legacy of the then mighty revenue officers holding the office of the Desai in the Portuguese and pre-Portuguese eras.
 Valpoi is the capital of this sub-district or taluka. It is believed that the name Valpoi derived from the phrase / व्हाळ पळय/ meaning, see the rivulet. Valpoi is the main town of Sattari and hub of merchants and the Muslim community settled there.
 Dabose It is a small hamlet of Veluz village falling under Valpoi Municipality area covering ward number 1 with voters population slightly crossing 800. It is situated on the bank of Mhadei river. Villages surrounding dabos are Massordem, Kudcem & Velguem. Dabos has PWD water purification plant which caters the drinking water needs of Sattari Taluka. The village has highly educated youth which are working around the corners of Goa. The son of Farmer Shri Narayan Dhuri is Dr. Sunder Dhuri who is one of them with highest qualification of PhD and post-doctoral research. Most of people are engaged in agriculture and enjoy their daily agricultural products.  
 Masorde probably has its name derived from the domestic animal, mhais/म्हैस/buffalo.
 Redeghati is not a village but a famous or infamous location for paranormal activities that are believed to be taking place after sunset. Its name derived from presence of bison in large numbers.
 Honda is not to be confused with the Japanese company of the same name. Like Ponda/फोंडा in Goa, which is probably derived from फोंड/pit, similarly Honda means Hond/होंड/pit.
 Pissurlem/पिसुर्ले is one of the prominent mining villages in Goa, Pissurlem was home of famous Maratha warrior Deepajirao Rane. The second family of the Ranes traces its Goa roots here.
 Kerim/Keri/केरी. A village which shares its name with two other Keri villages in Goa, this village has been a spectator to the development of Rane family in the world of politics from Keri to Sanquelim. Satroji Rane Sardesai was the founder of Rane family in Goa. The village is also famous for the temple of the guardian god, Shree Ajoba. The Rane's first family belongs here.
 Poriem/Parye/पर्ये* Another village from Sattari.
 Advoi. Home of Dada Rane, one of the Ranes who revolted against the Portuguese. The Rane's third family belongs to this place.
 Gawane. A village settled closed to Bondla Wildlife Sanctuary. Its name is derived from the animal Gawa/ गवा/ Bison. Gawane is a village densely covered with reserved forest. 
Shelop and Shelop Khurd. These twin villages are a part and neighbours to dense reserved forest. The name Shelop might have derived from Sanskrit word शिला. 
Morley and Morlem colony. Morlem/ मोर्ले is a village neighbouring Parye and Kerim whereas Morlem colony is a rehabilitated area of Anjunem Dam victims including villagers of Anjunem/ अंजुणे,Ponsuli/पणसुले,Gullem/गुळ्ळे and Kelavade/केळावडे.
 Vagheri.Vagheri/ वाघेरी is a third highest peak in the sub -district of Satari in North Goa in the state of Goa, trailed by Sosogad/Sonsogor/ सोसोगड which stands first and Kantalanchi Molli/ कांतलांची मळी being second.
 Bhirondem has been called "the 20th century village of settlers". It has around 500 voters, including 333 voters, and is one of the smallest villages of Goa. Isidore Domnick Mendis writes  that the village, according to its chroniclers, had hardly any human residents and the Portuguese government settled many Goans in the village. Most settlers came from other parts of Goa such as "Pernem, Arpora, Mapusa, Merces, Loutolim, Poriem, Usgao and Khandepar."

Bhirondem is known for the academic branch of prominent institute in Goa, "Pilar Fathers"; a well developed and maintained farm is a tourist attraction in this village.

References

Taluks of Goa
Geography of North Goa district